This is a detailed discography for American musician Charlie Daniels.  Much of his output, including all of his studio albums from 1974 to 1989, is credited to the Charlie Daniels Band.

Studio albums

1970s albums

1980s albums

1990s albums

2000s albums

2010s albums

Compilation and live albums

Christmas albums

Singles

1960s and 1970s

1980s

1990s

2000s and 2010s

Other singles

Guest singles

Music videos

Appearances as sideman
with Leonard Cohen:
Songs of Love and Hate
Live Songs
with Bob Dylan:
Nashville Skyline
New Morning
Self Portrait
with Marshall Tucker Band:
A New Life
Where We All Belong
with Ringo Starr:
Beaucoups of Blues

Notes
 
A^ "Uneasy Rider" also peaked at number 30 on the RPM Adult Contemporary Tracks chart in Canada.

References

Country music discographies
Rock music discographies
Discographies of American artists